De Visscher is a Dutch occupational surname. Visscher is an archaic spelling of Dutch visser meaning "fisherman". The name is now most common in East Flanders. People with this surname include:

 Charles De Visscher (1884–1973), Belgian jurist, brother of Fernand
 Cornelis de Visscher (1628/29–1658), Dutch engraver
  (1885–1964), Belgian legal historian, brother of Charles
 Jan de Visscher (1635/36-aft.1692), Dutch engraver and painter, brother of Cornelis
 Jeffrey de Visscher (born 1981), Dutch footballer
 Lambert de Visscher (1633–aft.1690), Dutch printmaker active in Italy, brother of Cornelis
  (1916–1996), Belgian jurist, son of Charles

References

See also
De Visser
Visscher

Dutch-language surnames
Occupational surnames